The 2001 NCAA Division III football season, part of the college football season organized by the NCAA at the Division III level in the United States, began in August 2001, and concluded with the NCAA Division III Football Championship, also known as the Stagg Bowl, in December 2001 at Salem Football Stadium in Salem, Virginia. The Mount Union Purple Raiders won their sixth, and second consecutive, Division III championship by defeating the Bridgewater (VA) Eagles, 30−27.

The Gagliardi Trophy, given to the most outstanding player in Division III football, was awarded to Chuck Moore, running back from Mount Union.

Conference and program changes

Conference standings

Conference champions

Postseason
The 2001 NCAA Division III Football Championship playoffs were the 29th annual single-elimination tournament to determine the national champion of men's NCAA Division III college football. The championship Stagg Bowl game was held at Salem Football Stadium in Salem, Virginia for the ninth time. This was the third bracket to feature 28 teams since last expanding in 1999.

Playoff bracket
{{32TeamBracket-Compact-NoSeeds-Byes
| RD1=First RoundCampus Sites
| RD2=Second RoundCampus Sites
| RD3=QuarterfinalsCampus Sites
| RD4=SemifinalsCampus Sites
| RD5=National Championship GameSalem Football StadiumSalem, Virginia

| RD1-team03=Augustana (IL)
| RD1-score03=54
| RD1-team04=Defiance
| RD1-score04=14
| RD1-team05= Wittenberg
| RD1-score05= 38*
| RD1-team06= Hardin–Simmons
| RD1-score06=35
| RD1-team07= Thomas More
| RD1-score07=34
| RD1-team08= MacMurray
| RD1-score08= 30

| RD1-team11= Pacific Lutheran
| RD1-score11= 27*
| RD1-team12= Whitworth
| RD1-score12= 26
| RD1-team13= Saint John's (MN)
| RD1-score13= 27| RD1-team14= St. Norbert
| RD1-score14= 20
| RD1-team15= UW–Stevens Point| RD1-score15= 37| RD1-team16= Bethel (MN)
| RD1-score16= 27

| RD1-team19= Ithaca| RD1-score19= 35| RD1-team20= Montclair State
| RD1-score20= 23
| RD1-team21=Rowan| RD1-score21= 40| RD1-team22= Brockport
| RD1-score22= 17
| RD1-team23= West. Conn. State| RD1-score23= 8| RD1-team24= Westfield State
| RD1-score24=7

| RD1-team27=Trinity (TX)| RD1-score27=30| RD1-team28= Mary Hardin–Baylor
| RD1-score28= 6
| RD1-team29= Widener| RD1-score29= 56| RD1-team30= Christopher Newport
| RD1-score30= 7
| RD1-team31= Wash. & Jefferson| RD1-score31=24| RD1-team32= Western Maryland
| RD1-score32=21

| RD2-team01=Mount Union| RD2-score01=32| RD2-team02=Augustana (IL)
| RD2-score02=7
| RD2-team03=Wittenberg| RD2-score03=41| RD2-team04=Thomas More
| RD2-score04=0

| RD2-team05=Central (IA)
| RD2-score05=21
| RD2-team06=Pacific Lutheran| RD2-score06=27*| RD2-team07=Saint John's (MN)
| RD2-score07=9
| RD2-team08=UW–Stevens Point
| RD2-score08=7

| RD2-team09=RPI
| RD2-score09=10
| RD2-team10=Ithaca
| RD2-score10=27
| RD2-team11=Rowan
| RD2-score11=43
| RD2-team12=West. Conn. State
| RD2-score12=14

| RD2-team13=Bridgewater (VA)
| RD2-score13=41
| RD2-team14=Trinity (TX)
| RD2-score14=37
| RD2-team15=Widener
| RD2-score15=46
| RD2-team16=Wash. & Jefferson
| RD2-score16=30

| RD3-team01=Mount Union
| RD3-score01=49
| RD3-team02=Wittenberg
| RD3-score02=21

| RD3-team03=Pacific Lutheran
| RD3-score03=6
| RD3-team04=Saint John's (MN)
| RD3-score04=31| RD3-team05=Ithaca
| RD3-score05=0
| RD3-team06=Rowan| RD3-score06=48| RD3-team07=Bridgewater (VA)| RD3-score07=57| RD3-team08=Widener
| RD3-score08=32

| RD4-team01=Mount Union| RD4-score01=35| RD4-team02=Saint John's (MN)
| RD4-score02=14

| RD4-team03=Rowan
| RD4-score03=24
| RD4-team04=Bridgewater (VA)| RD4-score04=29| RD5-team01=Mount Union| RD5-score01=30'| RD5-team02=Bridgewater (VA)
| RD5-score02=27
}}
* Overtime''

See also
2001 NCAA Division I-A football season
2001 NCAA Division I-AA football season
2001 NCAA Division II football season

References